U.S. Route 101 (US 101), is a major north–south U.S. Highway in Oregon that runs through the state along the coastline near the Pacific Ocean.  It runs from the California border, south of Brookings, to the Washington state line on the Columbia River, between Astoria, Oregon, and Megler, Washington.

US 101 is designated as the Oregon Coast Highway No. 9 (see Oregon highways and routes), as it serves the Oregon Coast region.  Much of the highway runs between the Pacific Ocean and the Oregon Coast Range, thus US 101 is frequently mountainous in character.  For most of its length it is a two-lane undivided highway.  Many parts of the highway are subject to closure due to landslides caused by excessive rainfall, and in many parts of the coast, US 101 is the only viable route connecting certain coastal communities.  Thus, in many cases when landslides block US 101, the detour requires traveling inland over the Coast Range to alternative north–south routes in the Willamette Valley and then back west over the Coast Range again.

US 101 is often the main street through coastal towns in Oregon, which can cause significant traffic delays.  This is especially true in Lincoln City, where geography and tourism combine to create traffic problems.

Route description

Brookings to Coos Bay
The run of US 101 in Oregon (from south to north) starts at the border with California, south of the twin cities of Brookings and Harbor (and north of Crescent City, California).  The highway is mostly a two-lane road, running along the Southern Oregon coastline.  Access to this section (other than 101) is via U.S. Route 199 or Oregon Route 42.  Access is also possible through National Forest Route 23 (NF-23 - Bear Camp) but that route is not maintained through the winter months.

Other coastal towns in this stretch of US 101 include Pistol River, Gold Beach, Wedderburn, and Port Orford.  North of Port Orford is the Cape Blanco region, and the westernmost point in the U.S. Highway system.  After passing through Sixes, Denmark, and Langlois, US 101 enters the resort town of Bandon on the mouth of the Coquille River.  Just north of Bandon, the highway crosses the river on the Bullards Bridge.

The stretch of US 101 between Brookings and Gold Beach includes the highest bridge in Oregon, the Thomas Creek Bridge.

North of Bandon, US 101 heads inland for a while, while a spur route provides access to the Charleston Peninsula.  Approaching the city of Coos Bay, US 101 becomes an expressway after an interchange with Oregon Route 42, then soon enters the downtown core.  It continues through Coos Bay (the city) along the western edge of Coos Bay (the bay), soon entering the city of North Bend.  North of North Bend, it crosses over the bay on the Conde McCullough Memorial Bridge, followed by a second bridge over Haynes Inlet.

Coos Bay to Lincoln City

North of Coos Bay, the highway runs along the eastern flank of the Oregon Dunes National Recreation Area, through the communities of North Bend, Hauser, Lakeside, and Winchester Bay before coming into the city of Reedsport on the mouth of the Umpqua River. The highway continues north from there, passing through the dunes and through the towns of Gardiner, Westlake, Dunes City, and Glenada. The next major town is Florence on the Siuslaw River.

The next stretch of US 101 (between Florence and Newport) closely follows the coastline, providing a wide view of the ocean.  Towns between these two cities include Yachats, Waldport, and Seal Rock.  Eventually, the highway crosses the Yaquina Bay Bridge into Newport.  Just before the bridge lies the Oregon Coast Aquarium; on the other side of the bridge is the famed Newport waterfront. Also in Newport, US Route 20 has its western Terminus at US 101.

The next stretch of 101, between Newport and Lincoln City, is rather mountainous, as the Coast Range protrudes into the ocean.  Cities on the route include Depoe Bay, Otter Rock (accessible via a side road), and the Gleneden Beach/Salishan area, famed for its resorts.  Near Siletz Bay is the abandoned community of Kernville, followed by Lincoln City.

Lincoln City to Astoria

The stretch of US 101 through Lincoln City is infamous for its clogged traffic; the city is over seven miles (11 km) long (but only a few blocks wide in spots), and is sandwiched between the ocean on the west, and Devils Lake and mountains to the east.  In many parts of town, the highway is a two-lane road.  Adding to the traffic is a casino in the northern part of town.  Much of the traffic departs US 101 north of Lincoln City, at an interchange with Oregon Route 18.

North of Lincoln City is the town of Neskowin and the Nestucca Bay area.  A side road, the Three Capes Scenic Route, provides access to the seaside towns of Pacific City and Sandlake, then goes over Cape Lookout and on to Netarts, Oceanside and Cape Meares before meeting 101 again at Tillamook.  101 instead heads inland, passing through the towns of Cloverdale, Hebo, Beaver and Hemlock.  The next major town is the city of Tillamook.

North of Tillamook, the highway passes on the eastern shore of Tillamook Bay, through towns such as Bay City and Garibaldi, before reuniting with the ocean.  It then continues north along the Pacific through towns such as Rockaway Beach and Nedonna Beach; the next major towns are Nehalem and Manzanita, both on Nehalem Bay.  The highway then continues north along the coastline through rugged terrain until it reaches the city of Cannon Beach.  Unlike most coastal cities in Oregon, a bypass (in two-lane freeway configuration) was built around Cannon Beach; US 101 follows the bypass alignment.  A few miles north of Cannon Beach is an interchange with U.S. Route 26, followed by the city of Seaside.  (Until recently, U.S. 26 continued north towards Astoria, sharing an alignment with US 101; however ODOT truncated U.S. 26 to its current terminus at the interchange with 101 several years ago.)

North of Seaside, US 101 follows the coastal plain through cities such as Gearhart; a spur route (Oregon Route 104) provides access to Fort Stevens State Park.  US 101 soon enters the city of Warrenton, Oregon (where Business 101, which is more of a scenic route, providing access to the Astoria-Warrenton Airport, Fort Clatsop, and Miles Crossing) and then crosses Youngs Bay into Astoria, Oregon.  101 passes through the northwestern edge of Astoria, until an intersection with the western terminus of U.S. Route 30.  At this intersection, 101 climbs an access road onto the Astoria-Megler Bridge over the Columbia River and crosses into the state of Washington.

History

US 101 was established in 1926 and replaced several earlier state highways.

In 1961-1963, US 101 was rerouted to bypass Coquille, but go to Bandon.

In 1966, Oregon legislators proposed adding US 101 or a parallel corridor to the Interstate Highway System as part of road upgrades between Coos Bay and Astoria.

In 2015, all of US 101 in Oregon was designated as the Persian Gulf, Afghanistan, and Iraq Veterans Memorial Highway by the state legislature.

Major intersections
Note: mileposts do not reflect actual mileage because of realignments.

See also

List of bridges on U.S. Route 101 in Oregon

References

External links

01-1
 Oregon
Oregon Coast
101
Transportation in Tillamook County, Oregon
Transportation in Lane County, Oregon
Transportation in Clatsop County, Oregon
Transportation in Coos County, Oregon
Transportation in Curry County, Oregon
Transportation in Douglas County, Oregon
Transportation in Lincoln County, Oregon